The Situation of Mehdi (Persian: موقعیت مهدی, romanized: Moghe-iateh Mehdi) is a 2022 Iranian biographical war drama film about Mehdi Bakeri, an Iranian war hero in the Iran-Iraq war. The film is directed by Hadi Hejazifar and written by Hejazifar and Ebrahim Amini. The film screened for the first time at the 40th Fajr Film Festival where it won 5 awards and earned 9 nominations.

Premise 
Mehdi Bakeri, the commander of the 31st Ashura Division, wants his younger brother Hamid to return to the area and be by his side, despite the difficulties he has encountered, Hamid accepts and joins. Now, after Operation Kheibar, Mehdi has to return home alone.

Cast 

 Hadi Hejazifar as Mehdi Bakeri
 Zhila Shahi as Safieh Modares
 Vahid Hejazifar as Hamid Bakeri
 Masoumeh Rabaninia as Maryam
 Rouhollah Zamani as Khosrow
 Hojjat Hassanpour Sargaroui as Kambiz
 Vahid Aghapoor

Reception

Critical response 

— Haft / Massoud Farasati

Accolades

References

External links 
 

Iranian drama films
2022 directorial debut films
2020s Persian-language films